Pankówka is a river of Poland, a tributary of the Liswarta near Krzepice.

Rivers of Poland
Rivers of Silesian Voivodeship